William Fish Marsden (20 June 1871 – 1943) was an English footballer who played in the Football League for Darwen. Marsden scored a consolation goal for Darwen in the 3-1 1891 Lancashire Cup Final defeat against Blackpool at Anfield.

References

1871 births
1943 deaths
English footballers
Darwen F.C. players
English Football League players
Association football forwards